Tupperville is a community on the Sydenham River in Chatham-Kent, Ontario, Canada and has a population of approx. 300 people. Tupperville was named after Canada's sixth Prime Minister Sir Charles Tupper.

The village historian Melba Simpson wrote a book on the village's history in 2003.

The first Fire station in Tupperville was started by Stuart Shaw who was chief for 10 years

Tupperville is located in close proximity to 2 larger towns - Wallaceburg (pop. 11,000) and Dresden (pop. 4,000). Thirty minutes south of Tupperville is the City of Chatham (pop. 42,000) and forty minutes north is the City of Sarnia (pop. 70,500).

External links 
Tupperville at Geographical Names of Canada

Communities in Chatham-Kent